The Italy men's national ball hockey team is the men's national ball hockey team of Canadian citizens with Italian heritage and a member of the International Street and Ball Hockey Federation (ISBHF).

World Championships
Italy made its world championship debut in 2003, were finished fourth place. In 2005 world championship the Italy won the bronze medal, defeating Portugal 6–1 in the bronze medal final game. 
  2019 Ball Hockey World Championship 2019        Kosice , Slovakia  5th place

External links 
 inbhf.com

Ball hockey
Ball Hockey